Percoidea is a superfamily of fish of the order Perciformes. The superfamily includes about 3,374 species.

Classification
The Percoidesa are classified in the 5th Edition of the Fishes of the World as follows:

 Percoidea                 
 Centropomidae (Snooks)
 Latidae (Lates)
 Gerreidae (Mojarras)
 Centrogenyidae (False scorpionfishes)
 Perciliidae (Southern basses)
 Howellidae (Oceanic basslets)
 Acropomatidae (Lanternbellies)
 Epigonidae (Deepwater cardinalfishes)
 Polyprionidae (Wreckfishes)
 Lateolabracidae (Asian seaperches)
 Mullidae (Goatfishes)
 Glaucosomatidae (Pearl perches)
 Pempheridae (Sweepers)
 Oplegnathidae (Knifejaws)
 Kuhliidae (Flagtails)
 Leptobramidae (Beachsalmon)
 Bathyclupeidae (Bathyclupeids)
 Polynemidae (Threadfins)
 Toxotidae (Archerfishes)
 Arripidae (Australasian salmon (kahawai))
 Dichistiidae (Galjoen fishes)
 Kyphosidae (Sea chubs)
 Terapontidae (grunters or tigerperches)
 Percichthyidae (temperate perches)
 Sinipercidae (Chinese perches)
 Enoplosidae (Oldwives)
 Pentacerotidae (Armourheads)
 Dinopercidae (Cavebasses)
 Banjosiidae (Banjofishes)
 Centrarchidae (Sunfishes)
 Serranidae (Sea basses)
 Percidae (Perches)
 Lactariidae (False trevallies)
 Dinolestidae (Long-finned pikes)
 Scombropidae (Gnomefishes)
 Pomatomidae (Bluefishes)
 Bramidae (Pomfrets)
 Caristiidae (Manefishes)

References

 
Vertebrate superfamilies
Percoidei